Douglas James Burgum (born August 1, 1956) is an American entrepreneur, philanthropist, and politician serving as the 33rd governor of North Dakota since 2016. He is a member of the Republican Party.

Burgum was born and raised in the small town of Arthur, North Dakota. He mortgaged his inherited farmland after graduating from college in 1983 to invest in a small technology startup, Great Plains Software. Becoming the company's president in 1984, he grew Great Plains into a successful large software company. Burgum sold the company to Microsoft for $1.1 billion in 2001. While working at Microsoft, he managed Microsoft Business Solutions. He has served as board chairman for Atlassian and SuccessFactors. Burgum is the founder of Kilbourne Group, a Fargo-based real-estate development firm, and also is the co-founder of Arthur Ventures, a software venture capital group.

A lifelong resident of North Dakota, Burgum entered the Republican primary in the 2016 North Dakota gubernatorial election with no political experience. He upset longtime Attorney General and Republican-endorsed candidate Wayne Stenehjem in the primary election, and defeated Democratic nominee Marvin Nelson by a landslide in the general election. He was reelected by a wide margin in 2020.

A fiscal conservative, Burgum has centered his platform around promoting conservative economic ideas. He is considered moderate on social issues.

Early life and education
Burgum was born on August 1, 1956 in Arthur, North Dakota, where his grandfather had founded a grain elevator in 1906. He is the son of Katherine (Kilbourne) and Joseph Boyd Burgum. He attended North Dakota State University (NDSU) to earn his undergraduate degree in 1978. During his senior year at NDSU, he applied to the Stanford Graduate School of Business. He also started a chimney-sweeping business. "The newspaper wrote a story about me as a chimney sweep", he later recalled; it "ran a photo of me sitting on top of an icy chimney in below-freezing weather in Fargo. The story made the AP wire service. I was later told it caused quite a stir in the Stanford admissions office: 'Hey, there's a chimney sweep from North Dakota who's applied.'"

He was accepted to study business at Stanford. While there, he befriended Steve Ballmer, who would later be CEO of Microsoft. During his last year at Stanford, Burgum "spent the whole final quarter on a project team with Ballmer." He received his MBA from Stanford University Graduate School of Business in 1980. He later received honorary doctorates from North Dakota State in 2000 and from the University of Mary in 2006.

Executive career

Early career
Following his graduation from Stanford GSB, Burgum moved to Chicago to become a consultant with McKinsey & Company. Soon afterward he mortgaged $250,000 of farmland to provide the seed capital for accounting software company Great Plains Software in Fargo, North Dakota. He joined the company in 1983 and became its president in 1984 after leading a small investment group composed of family members in buying out the rest of the company.

Great Plains Software
During the 1980s, Fortune magazine often ranked Great Plains among the top 100 companies to work for in the United States. Burgum grew the company to about 250 employees by 1989 and led the company to about $300 million in annual sales and a 1997 IPO, after using the Internet to help it expand beyond North Dakota. In 2001 he sold Great Plains Software to Microsoft for $1.1 billion. Burgum has said he built the company in Fargo because of its proximity to North Dakota State University, in order to employ its stream of engineering students.

Microsoft
After the sale, Burgum was named Senior Vice President of Microsoft Business Solutions Group, the offshoot created from merging Great Plains into the corporation. He stayed with Microsoft until 2007 and was responsible for making enterprise apps a priority for Microsoft during this tenure. Satya Nadella, current CEO of Microsoft, has credited Burgum with "inspiring him to find the soul of Microsoft".

Board work
Burgum has served on the advisory board for Stanford Graduate School of Business and was on the board of SuccessFactors during the 2000s, becoming its chairman from 2007 till the 2011 sale of the company to SAP. In 2012 he became the first chairman of the board for Atlassian, after it expanded from its initial board of three members (none of whom served as the official chair). During 2011 and 2014, he twice spent several months as the interim CEO of Intelligent InSites, a company for which he has served as the executive chairman of the board since 2008. That year he also became a member of Avalara's board of directors.

Investment firms
Burgum is the founder of the Kilbourne Group, a real-estate development firm focused on Downtown Fargo. In 2013 he created plans to build the tallest building in Fargo—a 23-story mixed-use building—to be named either Block 9 or Dakota Place. The company has also advocated for a convention center to be built in Downtown Fargo. It has acquired and renovated many Fargo properties, including the former St. Mark's Lutheran Church and the former Woodrow Wilson alternative high school. Burgum co-founded Arthur Ventures, a venture capital company. Several of the companies he has invested in are in Fargo.

Philanthropy
Burgum supports philanthropic causes like the Plains Art Museum. In 2001 he donated a refurbished school building he had acquired in 2000 to North Dakota State University. It was named Renaissance Hall and became home to the university's visual arts department, major components of the architecture and landscape architecture department and the Tri-College University office. In 2008 Burgum started the Doug Burgum Family Fund, which focuses its charitable giving on youth, education and health.

Governor of North Dakota

Elections

2016 

In 2016, Burgum announced his intent to run for governor of North Dakota as a Republican. With no formal political experience, Burgum lost the state Republican party's gubernatorial endorsement contest to longtime Attorney General Wayne Stenehjem at the party convention in April. Nevertheless, he defeated Stenehjem handily in the primary election two months later to claim the nomination. Burgum faced Democrat Marvin Nelson and Libertarian Marty Riske in the November general election and won with over 75% of the vote.

2020 

Burgum ran for reelection in 2020. He was reelected with over 65% of the vote against veterinarian Shelley Lenz.

Tenure
Burgum was sworn in as the 33rd governor of North Dakota on December 15, 2016, alongside running mate Brent Sanford, the 38th lieutenant governor of North Dakota.

On November 12, 2021, Burgum signed into law legislation banning critical race theory from public school curricula.

Uniquely among Republicans, Burgum has set a goal for North Dakota to become carbon-neutral by 2030. He plans to pursue this goal while maintaining a robust fossil fuel industry, through the use of carbon capture and storage technology to capture and sequester carbon dioxide in the state's geologic formations. He supports the use of carbon dioxide for enhanced oil recovery, the process by which carbon dioxide is injected into depleted oil fields to boost production. He also supports agricultural practices that store carbon in soil. The announcement of the goal sparked $25 billion in private sector investment, according to remarks he made at the annual meeting of the North Dakota petroleum council.

Burgum and other North Dakota officials have threatened to sue Minnesota over a law that requires the state's electricity to come from sources that do not emit carbon dioxide. 

On December 20, 2022, Sanford announced his resignation as lieutenant governor, effective January 3, 2023. Burgum chose Tammy Miller, his chief operating officer, to succeed Sanford.

Political positions
Burgum supports the proposed Dakota Access Pipeline.

In July 2020, Burgum called the 2020 Republican platform "divisive and divisional" on LGBT issues.

Personal life
Burgum married his first wife, Karen Stoker, in 1991. They have three children and divorced in 2003. In 2016, Burgum married Kathryn Helgaas.

Electoral history

References

External links
Office of the Governor official government site
Doug Burgum for Governor official campaign site

|-

|-

|-

|-

1956 births
20th-century American businesspeople
21st-century American businesspeople
21st-century American politicians
Businesspeople from North Dakota
Republican Party governors of North Dakota
Living people
Microsoft people
North Dakota State University alumni
People from Cass County, North Dakota
American philanthropists
Stanford Graduate School of Business alumni